Polygala ramosa is a species of flowering plant in the milkwort family (Polygalaceae). It is endemic to the coastal areas of the Southern and Eastern United States. It is an annual herb with a height of  that produces yellow flowers between the months of May and September.

References

ramosa
Flora of the United States